Blakely House may refer to:

Blakely House (Social Hill, Arkansas), listed on the NRHP in Arkansas
Ross H. Blakely House, Kingman, AZ, listed on the NRHP in Arizona